Mary Siddon (fl. 1783) was an English thief.

In 1783, Siddon was convicted of stealing a pork ham. She was sentenced to be 'severely and privately whipped, in the presence of females only.' This was considered to be a turning-point in English attitudes to public violence and a marker of the beginning of a more professionalised approach to policing and punishment.

References 

 The London Mob: Violence and Disorder in 18th-century England by Robert Shoemaker
 Mob mentalities, Robert Shoemanker, p. 53, BBC History Magazine, October 2004

Year of birth missing
Year of death missing
18th-century English criminals
British people convicted of theft
18th-century English women
18th-century English people